Pilibanga railway station is a railway station in Hanumangarh district, Rajasthan. Its code is PGK. It serves Pilibanga town. The station consists of 2 platforms. Passenger, Express, and Superfast trains halt here.

Trains

The following trains halt at Pilibanga railway station in both directions:

 Ahmedabad–Jammu Tawi Express
 Avadh Assam Express
 Kota–Shri Ganganagar Superfast Express
 Kalka–Barmer Express
 Bhavnagar Terminus–Udhampur Janmabhoomi Express

References

Railway stations in Hanumangarh district
Bikaner railway division